Léo Bérubé,  (October 27, 1884 – May 18, 1967) was a Canadian lawyer and politician.

Born in Saint-André, in Kamouraska, Quebec, Bérubé was educated at the Université Laval. He was admitted to the Quebec Bar in 1908. He was made a King's Counsel in 1938. He was a practising lawyer in Rivière-du-Loup for 40 years. Bérubé was elected to the Legislative Assembly of Quebec for Témiscouata in 1912. A Conservative, he was defeated in 1916 and again in 1923.

He died in Rivière-du-Loup in 1967.

References 

1884 births
1967 deaths
Canadian King's Counsel
Conservative Party of Quebec MNAs
Lawyers in Quebec
People from Bas-Saint-Laurent